All the Years is a song that was recorded by the rock band Chicago, released on the 2008 album Stone of Sisyphus. It was written by Robert Lamm and studio session musician Bruce Gaitsch, the guitarist from the Night & Day Big Band album.

This is the third track on the 2008 release. It was supposed to be the opening track on the original 1994 release.

Content
The song talks about the politics of the early nineties, when the album was recorded. It states how the politics haven't really changed from the late sixties, hence the line, "All the years we wasted, all the years we tried." This song was reminiscent of Lamm's earlier songwriting about politics and being outspoken.

Samples
"All The Years" features speeches by Martin Luther King Jr. and other activists from that time period playing in the background at various points of the song. It also includes audio of the protesters at the 1968 Democratic Convention shouting, "The Whole World's Watching." This is a gesture to Chicago's debut album, The Chicago Transit Authority, on the tenth track "Prologue, August 29, 1968."

References

2008 songs
Songs written by Robert Lamm
Song recordings produced by Peter Wolf (producer)
Chicago (band) songs
Songs written by Bruce Gaitsch